The People's Alliance for Gupkar Declaration (PAGD)  is a political alliance between the several political parties in Jammu and Kashmir campaigning for autonomy for the region by restoring special status along with Article 35A of the erstwhile state of Jammu and Kashmir. Farooq Abdullah is the president of the alliance.

Background 

On 5 August 2019, the Parliament of India revoked Article 370 of the Constitution of India, the temporary special status of Jammu and Kashmir, thereby ending the limited autonomy the state enjoyed in affairs other than foreign affairs, defence and communication, etc. Further, the state was re-organised and evolved into two new union territories, Jammu and Kashmir in the west and Ladakh in the east.

The Government of India had placed separatist leaders under house arrest and suspended internet services to maintain law and order for civilians and to tackle militancy.

Member parties

Current members
Jammu & Kashmir National Conference
Jammu and Kashmir People's Democratic Party
Communist Party of India (Marxist)
Jammu and Kashmir Awami National Conference

Former members
Jammu and Kashmir People's Conference (2020–2021)
Jammu & Kashmir People's Movement (2020–2022)

Gupkar declarations

First declaration 
On 4 August 2019, the following leaders met at Gupkar Residence:

The first Gupkar Declaration was unanimously passed by all present as a baseline:

Second declaration 
The second Gupkar Declaration, was signed on 22 August 2020 by seven political parties, including National Conference, People's Democratic Party, Communist Party of India (Marxist), Jammu and Kashmir People's Conference, Awami National Conference, Indian National Congress and Jammu & Kashmir People's Movement. The signatories once again asserted that they were bound by the status quo of August 4, 2019. The Gupkar declaration and parties would strive for the restoration of Article 370 and Article 35A.

On 17 November 2020, the Indian National Congress denied their involvement with the PAGD. Their Jammu and Kashmir leadership claimed that they may pursue a state-level electoral alliance but denied that they are signatories of the proclamations. The Congress Party also condemned Mehbooba Mufti's comments on abandoning the Indian Tricolour as well as Farooq Abdullah's statements asking for foreign interference into India's internal matters.

Later developments 
On 19 January 2021, the Jammu and Kashmir People's Conference announced that it was pulling out of the alliance, citing differences with the member parties. On 4 July 2022, Jammu & Kashmir People's Movement left the alliance citing lack of a clear roadmap.

Symbols
The alliance uses the flag of the former State of Jammu and Kashmir as an official symbol.

See also
 United Progressive Alliance
 All Jammu and Kashmir Plebiscite Front

References

External
Official Twitter feed

Srinagar
Organisations based in Jammu and Kashmir
Politics of Jammu and Kashmir
2019 establishments in Jammu and Kashmir
Political parties established in 2019